The Class D Leaksville-Draper-Spray Triplets was a Minor League Baseball team who played in three different leagues between the  and  seasons. The team was a combination of three separate towns from North Carolina (now Eden, Rockingham County, North Carolina).

The Triplets played from 1934 through 1942 in the Bi-State League, winning the Championship Title in 1he 1935 and 1941 seasons.

The team joined the Carolina League in 1945, playing there three years before moving to the Blue Ridge League in 1948. In June of that year, the team moved to the town of Abingdon, Virginia, to become the Abingdon Triplets, folding at the end of the season.

Team history

Affiliations

Major League Baseball alumni

Tal Abernathy
Fred Archer
Blackie Carter
George Cisar
Jess Cortazzo
Charlie Cuellar
Wes Ferrell
Joe Frazier
John Glenn
Dixie Howell
George Jeffcoat
Jim Mooney
Bill Nagel
Jim Pearce
Ray Poat
Carr Smith
Ray Shore
Rocky Stone
Clyde Sukeforth
Forrest Thompson
Woody Williams

Sources
Minor League Baseball Standings: All North American Leagues, through 1999 – Benjamin Barrett Sumner. Publisher: McFarland & Company, 2000. Format: Hardcover, 726pp. Language: English. 
Encyclopedia of Minor League Baseball: The Official Record of Minor League Baseball – Lloyd Johnson, Miles Wolff, Steve McDonald. Publisher: Baseball America, 1997. Format: Paperback, 672pp. Language: English.

External links
Baseball Reference Minor League Encyclopedia

Defunct minor league baseball teams
Defunct Carolina League teams
Baseball teams established in 1934
Sports clubs disestablished in 1948
Professional baseball teams in North Carolina
Brooklyn Dodgers minor league affiliates
Cleveland Guardians minor league affiliates
Chicago Cubs minor league affiliates
Rockingham County, North Carolina
1934 establishments in North Carolina
1948 disestablishments in North Carolina
Defunct baseball teams in North Carolina
Bi-State League teams
Baseball teams disestablished in 1948
Blue Ridge League teams